John Haskell may refer to:

 John G. Haskell (1832–1907), American architect
 John Haskell (author) (born 1958), American author